Elachista strenua is a moth of the family Elachistidae. It is found in Australia.

References

Moths described in 2011
strenua
Moths of Australia